Still the Same Ole Me is an album by American country music singer George Jones released in 1981 (see 1981 in country music) on the Epic Records label.

Recording and composition
Still the Same Ole Me built on the massive success of Jones comeback single "He Stopped Loving Her Today" and went to number 3 on Billboard'''s country albums chart. "Same Ole Me", an anthem of survival and enduring love written by Paul Overstreet and featuring backing from the Oak Ridge Boys, peaked at number 2 on the charts. Even more successful was the hardcore honky tonk ballad "Still Doin' Time" ("I've been living in hell with a bar for a cell..."), which gave Jones a number one smash. The album also includes a duet with his daughter by Tammy, Georgette, on "Daddy Come Home." The album track "I Won't Need You Anymore", would become a number one hit for Randy Travis in 1987. Same Ole Me was also the title of a 1989 documentary detailing the events of Jones's life and career.

Although Jones was enjoying immense success at this time, having renegotiated his contract with CBS, he was still ravaging his body with alcohol and cocaine, and appeared frighteningly frail when he made television appearances promoting the prophetic "Someday My Day Will Come." However, the same year that Still the Same Ole Me'' came out, Jones met a 34-year-old divorcée named Nancy Sepulveda from Mansfield, Louisiana. Nancy, who neither drank nor took drugs, would eventually marry Jones, manage his career, and turn his troubled life around.

Track listing

Certifications

References

External links
 George Jones' Official Website
 Record Label

1981 albums
George Jones albums
Epic Records albums
Albums produced by Billy Sherrill